Samannud is a city (markaz) located in Gharbia Governorate, Egypt. Known in classical antiquity as Sebennytos, Samannud is a historic city that has been inhabited since the Ancient Egyptian period. As of 2019, the population of the markaz of Samannud was estimated to be 410,388, with 83,417 people living in urban areas and 326,971 in rural areas.

Etymology
 Egyptian: ṯb-(n)-nṯr)

The name Samannud ultimately derives from the Ancient Egyptian name ṯb-(n)-nṯr, meaning "city of the sacred calf". The name was probably pronounced * in Old Egyptian and * or * in Late Egyptian.

Ancient history

Samannud (Sebennytos) was an ancient city of Lower Egypt, located on the now-silted up Sebennytic branch of the Nile in the Delta. Sebennytos was the capital of Lower Egypt's twelfth nome—the Sebennyte nome (district). Sebennytos was also the seat of the Thirtieth Dynasty of Egypt (380–343 BCE).

Sebennytos is perhaps best known as the hometown of Manetho, a historian and chronicler from the Ptolemaic era, c. 3rd century BC. Sebennytos was also the hometown of Nectanebo II; he was its last ruler.

A temple dedicated to the local god Anhur, or Anhur-Shu, and his lioness goddess mate Mehit, once existed at this location but is now reduced to ruins. A fragment from the location where kings would have made offerings to Anhur and his wife, is on display at the Walters Art Museum.

Modern history
Samannud violently resisted the Muslim conquest of Egypt in 639, and remained rebellious for some time thereafter; the city revolted four times in the first half of the eighth century. Three Coptic Patriarchs came from Samannud: John III, Cosmas II, and John V. The 12th-century Coptic philologist Yuhanna al-Samannudi also came from Samannud, and served as its bishop.

Samannud's bishopric remained active through the late thirteenth century, indicating the presence of a large Christian population at the time.

In 1843, John Gardner Wilkinson described it as a place of some size, with the usual bazaars of the large towns of Egypt, and famous for its pottery, which was sent to Cairo.

The 1885 Census of Egypt recorded Samannud as a city in its own district in Gharbia Governorate; at that time, the population of the city was 11,550 (5,686 men and 5,864 women).

In religious traditions
In a Coptic tradition, Sebennytos was part of the route of the Holy Family during the flight into Egypt narrated in the Gospel of Matthew (2:13–23).

Gallery

See also

List of cities and towns in Egypt

References

Populated places established in the 4th century BC
Archaeological sites in Egypt
Roman sites in Egypt
Former populated places in Egypt
Nile Delta
Cities in ancient Egypt
Thirtieth Dynasty of Egypt
Geography of Egypt
Former capitals of Egypt